DWRW (95.1 FM), broadcasting as RW 95.1, is a radio station owned and operated by RadioWorld Broadcasting Corporation, a unit of the Laus Group of Companies. The station's studio and transmitter are located at the 3rd Floor CGIC Building, Jose Abad Santos Avenue, San Fernando, Pampanga. It operates daily from 5:00 AM to 10:00 PM.

It was launched on August 17, 1995, as a center of communication and relief operation hub for the victims of the Mt. Pinatubo lahars. It is an affiliate of Radio Mindanao Network since 2017.

Awards
RW 95.1 FM earned the 16th, 20th, 24th and 27th KBP Golden Dove Awards (2007, 2011, 2016 and 2019) as Best Provincial FM Radio Station in the Philippines.

See also
CLTV 36

References

Radio stations in Pampanga
Radio stations established in 1995
OPM formatted radio stations in the Philippines